Mandić is a Serbo-Croatian surname, a matronymic of the feminine given name Manda, a hypocorism of Mandalena, a variant of Magdalena imported from Italian.

Notable people with the name include:

 Aleksandar Mandić (born 1988), Serbian politician
 Andrija Mandić (born 1965), Montenegrin Serb politician
 Ante Mandić (1881-1959), Croatian and Yugoslavian politician and lawyer
 Danilo Mandic, English engineer
 Danko Mandić (born 1957), Croatian sailor
 David Mandić (born 1997), Croatian handball player
 Dominik Mandić (1889–1973), Bosnian Croat Franciscan priest and supporter of the Ustaše movement
 Dušan Mandić (born 1994), Serbian water polo player
 Đuka Mandić (1822-1892), mother of Nikola Tesla
 Igor Mandić (born 1939), Croatian writer and journalist
 Igor Mandić (born 1991), Bosnian handball player
 John Mandic (1919-2003), American basketball player of Croatian origin
 Lara Mandić (born 1974), Yugoslavian and Serbian former female basketball player
 Leopold Mandić (1866–1942), Croatian saint
 Marko Mandič (1939-1991), Croatian rower
 Marko Mandić (1999), Serbian footballer
 Matko Mandić (1849-1915), Catholic priest and Croatian nationalist politician
 Milica Mandić (born 1991), Serbian taekwondo athlete and two-time Olympic champion
 Milorad Mandić (1961-2016), Serbian actor
 Momčilo Mandić (born 1954), Bosnian Serb political and business figure
 Nada Mandić (born 1969), Serbian politician
 Nikola Mandić (1869–1945), Croatian politician
 Nikola Mandić (born 1995), Croatian footballer
 Nikolaj Mandić (1840-1907), Serbian theologian and Metropolitan
 Oliver Mandić (born 1953), Yugoslav and Serbian pop musician
 Pinar Karaca-Mandic, Turkish-American health economist
 Sanja Mandić (born 1995), Serbian basketball player
 Slavko Mandić (born 1972), Serbian-born Croatian footballer
 Staniša Mandić (born 1995), Montenegrin footballer
 Svetislav Mandić (1921-2003), Yugoslav and Serbian historian, copier, fresco conserver, poet and painter
 Veljko Mandić (1924-1988), Montenegrin actor
 Vladimir Mandić (born 1980), Serbian former handball player and businessman
 Vladimir Mandić (born 1987) Slovenian footballer of Serbian descent
 Vuk Mandić (born 1975), Serbian-American astrophysicist
 Vukašin Mandić (born 1982), Serbian basketball player
 a brotherhood of the Maleševci tribe

References

Bosnian surnames
Croatian surnames
Serbian surnames
Matronymic surnames